This article documents the 1989–90 season of football club Wimbledon F.C.

League table

Results

First Division

FA Cup

League Cup

Full Members' Cup

Squad

References 

Wimbledon F.C. seasons
Wimbledon F.C.